Curtis Raymond Dickey (born November 27, 1956) is an American former professional football player who was a running back in the National Football League (NFL) for 7 seasons, spending most of his career with the Baltimore/Indianapolis Colts.

College
Dickey was a two-sport athlete at Texas A&M University where he was an outstanding running back in football. As a world-class sprinter, Dickey also excelled in track and field, winning the NCAA championship in the 60 yard dash three times (1978–1980). His 10.11 in the 100 meters was the sixth fastest time in the world in 1978. He also posted a personal best of 6.10 seconds in the 55 meters.

At the 1980 Southwest Texas Indoor Track and Field Championship, Dickey finished second behind Herkie Walls in the 60-yard dash (55 meters).

Professional football
Dickey was selected by the Baltimore Colts in the 1st round (5th overall) of the 1980 NFL Draft. Dickey played seven NFL seasons from 1980–1986. In 1980, he was a rookie sensation for Baltimore when he rushed for 11 touchdowns. His best year as a pro came during the 1983 season for the Colts when he rushed for 1,122 yards and four touchdowns. Plagued with injuries throughout his career, Dickey retired after the 1986 season with the Cleveland Browns.

References

1956 births
Living people
American football running backs
Texas A&M Aggies football players
Baltimore Colts players
Indianapolis Colts players
Cleveland Browns players
People from Madisonville, Texas
Players of American football from Texas
USA Indoor Track and Field Championships winners